Lachesis (minor planet designation: 120 Lachesis) is a large main-belt asteroid. It was discovered by French astronomer Alphonse Borrelly on April 10, 1872, and independently by German-American astronomer Christian Heinrich Friedrich Peters on April 11, 1872, then named after Lachesis, one of the Moirai, or Fates, in Greek mythology.

This body is orbiting the Sun with a period of 5.50 years and an eccentricity (ovalness) of 0.05. The orbital plane is inclined by 7° to the plane of the ecliptic. Photometric observations of this asteroid were made in early 2009 at the Organ Mesa Observatory in Las Cruces, New Mexico. The resulting light curve shows a synodic rotation period of 46.551 ± 0.002 hours with a brightness variation of 0.14 ± 0.02 in magnitude. It is a very slow rotator with the longest rotation period of an asteroid more than 150 km in diameter. As a primitive C-type asteroid it is probably composed of carbonaceous material.

References

External links 
 
 

000120
Discoveries by Alphonse Borrelly
Named minor planets
000120
000120
18720410